Stillingia is a plant genus of the family Euphorbiaceae, first described for modern science as a genus in 1767. The genus is native to Latin America, the southern United States, and various islands in the Pacific and Indian Oceans. Toothleaf is a common name for plants in this genus.

Medical use
Stillingia sylvatica was used by Native Americans for syphilis and as a cathartic, diuretic, laxative, and emetic. In large doses, it causes vomiting and diarrhea.

Taxonomy
Species include:

Many species formerly in Stillingia have been moved to other genera, including Actinostemon, Adenopeltis, Anomostachys, Balakata, Bonania, Ditrysinia, Excoecaria, Grimmeodendron, Gymnanthes, Homalanthus, Maprounea, Microstachys, Neoshirakia, Sapium, Sclerocroton, Sebastiania, Shirakiopsis, Spegazziniophytum, Spirostachys, and Triadica.

References

 
Euphorbiaceae genera